Roelof Jakobus Dednam (born 21 August 1985) is a male badminton player from South Africa. Dednam played badminton at the 2008 Summer Olympics in men's doubles with Chris Dednam, losing in the round of 16 to Howard Bach and Bob Malaythong of the United States.

Achievements

All Africa Games 
Men's doubles

Mixed doubles

African Championships
Men's doubles

Mixed doubles

BWF International Challenge/Series
Men's singles

Men's doubles

 BWF International Challenge tournament
 BWF International Series tournament
 BWF Future Series tournament

References

External links 
 
 
 
 

1985 births
Living people
Sportspeople from Bloemfontein
South African male badminton players
Badminton players at the 2008 Summer Olympics
Olympic badminton players of South Africa
Competitors at the 2007 All-Africa Games
Competitors at the 2011 All-Africa Games
African Games gold medalists for South Africa
African Games silver medalists for South Africa
African Games bronze medalists for South Africa
African Games medalists in badminton